Col du Lein (el. 1623 m.) is a high mountain pass in the Alps in the canton of Valais in Switzerland. It connects Saxon in the valley of the Rhône with Vollèges in the Val de Bagnes.

See also
 List of highest paved roads in Europe
 List of mountain passes

Lein
Lein